The Jonangi, also known as Jonangi Jagilam  or Kolleti Jagilam is an Indian dog breed, mostly found in the separated state of Andhra Pradesh, some parts of Karnataka, and all along the east coast from West Bengal to Tamil Nadu. It was once abundantly found in and around Kolleru Lake in West Godavari and Krishna Districts of Andhra Pradesh. This dog has very short, smooth hair. It is used as a hunting and herding dog by people who have this breed.

The Jonangi is not recognized by major kennel clubs in India, but this breed is locally shown at beach festivals in Andhra Pradesh.

Temperament 
The Jonangi  is a one-person or one-family dog. It is an agile dog, with long strides that can cover very large distances.

While a few dogs exhibit nervousness, most Jonangis make excellent working partners, guarding large farms and even houses.

They are known to coexist with farm animals such as poultry, goats, sheep and cattle.

Jonangis are known for digging decently sized ditches to lay in the dirt.

If properly socialized as puppies and trained with positive reinforcement, Jonangis grow up into confident adults. They can make excellent family companions and do well with children.

Breeding 
Females come into heat every six months, depending on their health. Typical litter size is 3–5 puppies.

Jonangi dams are excellent mothers and take good care of their pups. Their fertility rate is in line with other Indian dog breeds

Use 
Jonangi are used for hunting small game, as a watchdog, and for herding ducks.

Near-extinction 
The Jonangi was once commonly found around Kolleru Lake helping local duck farmers to herd their ducks. Farmers around Kolleru have turned towards more profitable aquaculture and the Jonangi that once helped them herd ducks no longer have a working function, and have been left in a semi-feral state to survive for themselves.

The Jonangi has developed unique fishing techniques for its survival, and is now considered a pest by local farmers, who went on killing these dogs to near-extinction.

Breed revival 
Once found around the entire coastal region of India, this breed is now found mostly in Andhra Pradesh, Karnataka, Tamil Nadu, Maharashtra and Goa. Lately major Asil chicken breeders and farm owners in Andhra Pradesh are interested in keeping this breed to protect their asil birds and livestock from predators.

See also
 Dogs portal
 List of dog breeds
 List of dog breeds from India

References

Dog breeds originating in India